A Son of David is a 1920 British silent sports film directed by Hay Plumb and starring Poppy Wyndham, Ronald Colman, and Arthur Walcott.

Premise
A young Jewish boy from Whitechapel becomes a professional boxer in the hope of fighting the man he believes murdered his father.

Cast
 Poppy Wyndham - Esther Raphael 
 Ronald Colman - Maurice Phillips 
 Arthur Walcott - Louis Raphael 
 Constance Backner - Miriam Myers 
 Robert Vallis - Sam Myers 
 Joseph Pacey - Maurice, as a child 
 Vesta Sylva - Esther as a child

Preservation status
A Son of David is now considered a lost film.

See also
List of lost films

References

External links

A Son of David at SilentEra 

1920 films
1920s sports films
British boxing films
Broadwest films
Films directed by Hay Plumb
Films set in London
Lost British films
British black-and-white films
1920s English-language films
1920s British films
1920 lost films
Lost sports films
Silent sports films